Mary Moore (born 25 June 1957) is a Western Australian artist. Her paintings are inspired by the day-to-day existence of her family,  creating works that speak of optimism and confidence about life. She makes spaces that she charges with her meanings so that people who look at them can become evolved and make up their own stories.

Her work 'Big brain' was produced while she was a student in printmaking at WAIT (now Curtin University). Her approach derives from pop art, making use of puns, such as her Gay Paris and the Eyefull Tower from her stamp series, and incorporating throw away items to comment on contemporary culture.

In 1999 she was part of the group exhibition Rebirth, Western Australian Women Celebrating a Century of Change at the Moores Building and curated by Lyn DiCiero.

Solo exhibitions 
Moore has exhibited at museums and galleries in Australia:
 1991  Self Portrait, Lawrence Wilson Art Gallery, University of Western Australia
 1989  Artist in Focus 7 - Mary Moore, Art Gallery of Western Australia
 1983  Gallery 52, Claremont, WA
 1982  Prints from London - Drawings from everywhere, Gallery A, Sydney
 1981  Gallery 52, Claremont, WA
 1979  Drawings x Paintings, Fremantle Arts Centre, WA
 1977  Red Dingo Show, Undercroft Gallery, UWA

Collections 
Moore's work is included in public collections, including 
 Art Gallery of Western Australia
 Lawrence Wilson Art Gallery at the University of Western Australia
 Royal College of Art, London
 Janet Holmes à Court Collection

References 

1957 births
Australian women artists
Living people